was a town located in Kuga District, Yamaguchi Prefecture, Japan.

As of 2003, the town had an estimated population of 9,519 and a density of 326.22 persons per km². The total area was 29.18 km².

On March 20, 2006, Yū, along with the towns of Kuga, Mikawa, Miwa, Nishiki and Shūtō, and the village of Hongō (all from Kuga District), was merged into the expanded city of Iwakuni.

Sports

The town is home to Hiroshima Toyo Carp's minor league team.

References

External links
 Iwakuni official website 

Dissolved municipalities of Yamaguchi Prefecture